Jaune River (French for Yellow River) may refer to:

 Jaune River (Saint-Charles River), tributary of the Saint-Charles River, Quebec, Canada
 Jaune River (Noire River), tributary of the Noire River, in Acton Regional County Municipality, Montérégie, Quebec, Canada
 Hart Jaune River, watercourse of Rivière-Mouchalagane, Caniapiscau, Côte-Nord, Quebec, Canada